Zhu Mengwan (朱孟烷; 1382–1439), the 2nd Prince of Chu (楚王), was an imperial prince of the Ming dynasty. He was the third son of Zhu Zhen, Prince Zhao, and was made Prince of Chu in 1424. He died in 1439, and one year later his son, Zhu Jini, inherited.

Family 
Consorts and Issue:

 Princess consort of Chu, of the Deng clan (楚王妃 鄧氏; d. 1442) (created 1425), daughter of Deng Yu, Prince of Wushun of Ninghe's (寧河武順王 鄧愈) second son,  Deng Ming (鄧銘)
 Lady, of the Zhu clan (诸氏)
 Zhu Jini, Prince Xian of Chu (楚憲王 朱季堄; 1413–1443), first son
 Lady, of the Wu clan (夫人 鄔氏)
 Zhu Jichu, Prince Kang of Chu (楚康王朱季埱; 1423–1462), second son
 Zhu Jili, Prince Gongding of Dong'an (東安恭定王 朱季塛; 1426 – 18 October 1462), third son
 Lady, of the Li clan (李氏)
 Zhu Jiruan, Prince Daoxi of Daye (大冶悼僖王 朱季堧), fourth son
 Unknown
 Princess Xinhua (新化郡主), first daughter
Married Liu Xian (劉獻)
 Second daughter
 Princess Xiangxiang (湘乡郡主), third daughter
Married Wang Qian (王谦)

References 

1382 births
1439 deaths
Ming dynasty imperial princes